The Broker's Man  is a BBC British television drama series centred on the work of Jimmy Griffin, an ex-detective who applies his skills as a fraud investigator for an insurance company. Produced by Bentley Productions for BBC One, the series starred Kevin Whately as Griffin and ran for two series from 17 June 1997 to 27 August 1998. The series was filmed in the intermittent years of Whately's portrayal of Inspector Lewis in both Inspector Morse and Lewis. The complete series was released on DVD by Acorn Media UK on 4 February 2008. Each episode was a self-contained 90-minute story.

Cast
 Kevin Whately as James 'Jimmy' Griffin
 Annette Ekblom as Sally Griffin
 Danny Worters as Dominic Griffin
 Holly Davidson as Jodie Griffin
 Al Hunter Ashton as Vinnie Stanley
 Jill Baker as Claudette Monro-Foster
 Sarah-Jane Potts/Charlotte Bellamy as Harriet Potter
 Michelle Fairley as Gabby Rodwell
 Trevor Byfield as Frank Mortimer
 Peter Firth/John McEnery as Alex 'Godzilla' Turnbull
 Grant Masters as William Addison

Episode list

Series 1 (1997)

Series 2 (1998)

References

External links 
 
 

1990s British drama television series
1997 British television series debuts
1998 British television series endings
BBC television dramas
1990s British crime television series
English-language television shows
Television series by All3Media
Television shows set in Liverpool